Çapanzade or Çapanoğlu Agah Efendi (1832 – 1885) was an Ottoman civil servant, writer and newspaper editor who, along with his colleague İbrahim Şinasi, published Tercüman-ı Ahvâl ("Interpreter of Events"), the first private newspaper by Turkish journalists, and introduced postage stamps to the Ottoman Empire.

Biography 
Agah Efendi was born in Yozgat and his father's name was Çapanzade Ömer Hulûsi Efendi.

He is also known as being a member of the Young Ottomans, a reformist secret society that enabled the first introduction of a constitutional system to the Empire, resulting in the short-lived First Constitutional Era.

See also
 History of Middle Eastern newspapers

References

External links

Ottoman Empire / Turkey. The “Sultan” Collection of the Tughra Issues (Part I)

19th-century writers from the Ottoman Empire
1832 births
1885 deaths
Young Turks
Civil servants from the Ottoman Empire
People from Yozgat